Salvia blancoana is a prostrate perennial that is native to Spain and northwest Africa. It has narrow blue-green leaves and pale violet-blue flowers. Due to its being highly variable in the wild, and because of similarities to Salvia candelabrum and Salvia lavandulifolia, it has often been confused with those two. Current opinion gives S. blancoana distinct species status, even while some botanists consider it a subspecies of its two close relatives. It differs from S. lavandulifolia and S. candelabrum in being prostrate, as opposed to merely low-growing. It also has whorls of 2–6, compared to 6–9 in S. lavandulifolia.

Notes

External links
 IPNI listing

blancoana